Adrien Albert  (19 November 1907 – 29 December 1989) was a leading authority in the development of medicinal chemistry in Australia. Albert also authored many important books on chemistry, including one on selective toxicity.

His father, Jacques Albert, was a businessman in the music industry, and took a bride many years his junior; Mary Eliza Blanche. Albert had two much older half brothers, stemming from his father's previous marriage. After a few years, Jacques died, and so, Adrien Albert was raised by his mother and another relative. Albert attended schools in Randwick and Coogee, but soon settled into the Scots College in Sydney where he excelled in both music and science. He graduated in 1924.

Education and appointments
He was awarded BSc with first class honours and the University Medal in 1932 at the University of Sydney. He gained a PhD in 1937 and a DSc in 1947 from the University of London. His appointments included Lecturer at the University of Sydney (1938–1947), advisor to the Medical Directorate of the Australian Army (1942–1947), research at the Wellcome Research Institute in London (1947–1948) and in 1948 the Foundation Chair of Medical Chemistry in the  John Curtin School of Medical Research at the Australian National University in Canberra where he established the Department of Medical Chemistry. He was  a Fellow of the Australian Academy of Science.

Scholarship
Albert was a scholar of heterocyclic chemistry. He authored Selective Toxicity: The Physico-Chemical Basis of Therapy, first published by Chapman and Hall in 1951.

Honors and legacy
Albert was made an Officer of the Order of Australia (AO) in the 1989 Australia Day Honours for "services to medical chemistry, particularly in the fields of teaching and research".

The Adrien Albert Laboratory of Medicinal Chemistry at the University of Sydney was established in his honour in 1989. His bequest funds the Adrien Albert Lectureship, awarded every two years by the Royal Society of Chemistry. The Royal Australian Chemical Institute established the Adrien Albert award in his honour.

References

External links
An account of his life, www.chem.swin.edu.au
Bright Sparcs Biographical entry, www.asap.unimelb.edu.au
Memoir originally published in Historical Records of Australian Science, Vol.8, No.2, 1990, 63-75.
D.J. Brown Historical Records of Australian Science, Vol.8, No.2, 1990, 63-75, sydney.edu.au
 Australian Academy of Science Biographical Memoirs of Deceased Fellows, www.asap.unimelb.edu.au
 

1907 births
1989 deaths
Australian chemists
Fellows of the Australian Academy of Science
Alumni of the University of London
People from Canberra
Scientists from Sydney
Officers of the Order of Australia